Ramon Untersander (born January 21, 1991) is a Swiss professional ice hockey defenseman currently playing for SC Bern of the National League (NL).

He participated for the Swiss national team at the 2017 IIHF World Championship and at the 2018 IIHF World Championship winning a silver medal.

Career statistics

Regular season and playoffs

International

Awards and honours

References

External links

1991 births
Living people
SC Bern players
EHC Biel players
HC Davos players
Ice hockey players at the 2018 Winter Olympics
Ice hockey players at the 2022 Winter Olympics
Olympic ice hockey players of Switzerland
Swiss ice hockey defencemen
Sportspeople from the canton of St. Gallen